The Super High Altitude Research Project (Super HARP, SHARP) was a U.S. government project conducting research into the firing of high-velocity projectiles high into the atmosphere using a two-stage light-gas gun, with the ultimate goal of propelling satellites into Earth orbit. Design work on the prototype space gun began as early as 1985 at the Lawrence Livermore National Laboratory in California and became operational in December 1992. It is the largest gas gun in the world.

Design and operation

The firing sequence begins with the ignition of a methane gas mixture in the combustion section behind the piston at the far end of the pump tube. The resultant explosion rapidly drives the 1-ton steel piston down the pump tube and further compresses the pre-pressurized hydrogen gas that fills the other end of the pump tube. The small projectile, meanwhile, rests in the adjacent depressurized launch tube. As the hydrogen gas reaches maximum pressure, a coupling holding the projectile in place is destroyed and the hydrogen drives the projectile down a 4-in diameter barrel at extremely high velocities until it bursts through a thin plastic sheet covering the end of the gun. All recoil forces are absorbed by the rail-mounted sleds as they are propelled outwards along their tracks.

Tests and cancellation

The tests were designed as a precursor to the "Jules Verne Launcher," an even larger light-gas gun with a  barrel length designed in the early 1990s for first-stage satellite launch. This was to cost $1 billion, but funding was not forthcoming and the project was eventually canceled in 1995. However, the SHARP gun continued to be used for high-speed tests in other areas of research, such as scramjet development.

The concept of ballistic escape velocity is well proven.  The largest challenge is maintaining such high velocities, because air resistance and aerothermal heating will significantly slow down any such object.

See also
 Quicklaunch, proposed by SHARP scientist John Hunter.
 Non-rocket spacelaunch
 Project HARP
 Verneshot
 Operation Plumbbob

References

External links 
  [Article about SHARP.]  
 Fiscal and feasibility comparison of various Earth-based satellite launching systems including the SHARP from JOBS for the 21st Century.
 The flying mineshaft cover is discussed under the section Pascal-B from the nuclearweaponsarchive.org overview of atmospheric nuclear testing in Nevada.

Space guns
Research projects
Non-rocket spacelaunch

de:High Altitude Research Project#SHARP